Nicolas Timmermans is a Belgian footballer who plays for FC Ganshoren as a right-back.

References

External links
 

Living people
1982 births
Belgian footballers
R.W.D. Molenbeek players
Lierse S.K. players
K.V. Kortrijk players
K.V.C. Westerlo players
R.A.E.C. Mons players
K.A.S. Eupen players
Belgian Pro League players
Challenger Pro League players
Association football defenders
RWDM47 players